Government Higher Secondary School may refer to:

India

Arunachal Pradesh
Independent Golden Jubilee Government Higher Secondary School, Pasighat

Assam
Golaghat Government Bezbaruah Higher Secondary School

Kerala
Government Higher Secondary School Maloth Kasba
Government Higher Secondary School Nedungome
Government Higher Secondary School Omallur
Government Higher Secondary School, Palayamkunnu
Government Higher Secondary School Panamattom
Government Higher Secondary School, Pandikkad
Government Higher Secondary School Sreekandapuram
Government Higher Secondary School for Girls Cottonhill
Government Model Boys Higher Secondary School, Kollam
Government Model Higher Secondary School Nadavaramba
Government Model Higher Secondary School, Punnamoodu
Government Model Boys Higher Secondary School, Thiruvananthapuram
Government Model Higher Secondary School for Boys, Thrissur
Government Model Higher Secondary School, Varkala
Meenakshi Vilasam Government Vocational Higher Secondary School
Meenangadi Government Higher Secondary School
Pandit Mothilal Government Model Higher Secondary School
Vailoppilli Sreedhara Menon Memorial Government Vocational Higher Secondary School

Tamil Nadu
Government Higher Secondary School, Eriyodu
Government Higher Secondary School Kurunikulathupatti
Government Higher Secondary School Palayajayankondam
Bharathiar Government Higher Secondary School
Thiruvalluvar Government Higher Secondary School

Tripura
Khowai Government Higher Secondary School

West Bengal
Bagmari-Manicktala Government Sponsored Higher Secondary School

Pakistan

Khyber Pakhtunkhwa

Pakistan Punjab
Government Boys Higher Secondary School, Ahmad Nagar Chattha
Government Girls Higher Secondary School, Ahmad Nagar Chattha

See also
Government Higher Secondary Institute Botingoo, Jammu and Kashmir, India
Government Senior Secondary School (disambiguation)